Yucca mixtecana García-Mend. is a plant species in the family Asparagaceae, native to the Mexican states of Puebla and Oaxaca. The plant reaches a height of 6 m (20 feet), and has evergreen leaves with entire margins.

References

mixtecana
Flora of Oaxaca
Flora of Puebla